5905 Johnson, provisional designation , is a Hungaria asteroid and synchronous binary system from the innermost regions of the asteroid belt, approximately  in diameter. It was discovered on 11 February 1989, by American astronomer Eleanor Helin at Palomar Observatory in California, United States. It was named after American astronomer and engineer Lindley N. Johnson.

Classification and orbit 

Johnson is a stony S-type asteroid and member of the dynamical Hungaria group, which forms the innermost dense concentration of asteroids in the Solar System. It is, however, not a member of collisional Hungaria family, but a non-family asteroid of the main belt's background population when applying the hierarchical clustering method to its proper orbital elements.

It orbits the Sun in the inner asteroid belt at a distance of 1.8–2.0 AU once every 2 years and 8 months (964 days; semi-major axis of 1.91 AU). Its orbit has an eccentricity of 0.07 and an inclination of 28° with respect to the ecliptic. As no precoveries were taken, and no prior identifications were made, the body's observation arc begins at Palomar with its official discovery observation in February 1989.

Diameter and albedo 

According to the surveys carried out by NASA's space-based Spitzer and WISE telescopes, and the NEOWISE mission, Johnson measures between 3.62 and 4.791 kilometers in diameter, and its surface has an albedo between 0.19 and 0.44. The Collaborative Asteroid Lightcurve Link adopts Petr Pravec's revised WISE-data, that is, an albedo of 0.1524 and a diameter of 4.80 kilometers for an absolute magnitude of 14.255.

Moon and lightcurves 

Between 1 and 11 April 2005, the first ever rotational lightcurve was obtained from photometric observations taken by astronomers Brian Warner at the Palmer Divide Observatory, Colorado, by Petr Pravec and Peter Kušnirák at Ondřejov Observatory, Czech Republic, by Adrián Galád and Štefan Gajdoš at Modra Observatory, Slovakia, and by P. Brown and Z. Krzeminski of the Department of Physics and Astronomy at UWO in Ontario, Canada.

These observations revealed, that Johnson is a synchronous binary asteroid with a moon orbiting its primary every 21.785 hours. The observed mutual asteroid occulation and eclipsing events had a magnitude of between 0.15 and 0.18 magnitude, suggesting that the satellite's diameter measures % of that of Johnson (a secondary-to-primary diameter ratio of 0.4), which translates into a mean-diameter of 1.4–1.9 kilometer.

Since Johnsons first observation in April 2005, astronomer Brian Warner and Petr Pravec have obtained additional lightcurves. They gave a revised rotation period for the primary of 3.7814 to 3.7824 hours with a brightness variation between 0.10 and 0.20 magnitude. These observations also confirmed that Johnson is a binary system, giving a concurring orbital period of 21.78 to 21.797 hours for the satellite. For an asteroid of its size, Johnson has a somewhat fast spin rate, but still significantly above those of fast rotators. CALL adopts a rotation period of 3.7824 hours with an amplitude of 0.20 magnitude.

Naming 

This minor planet was named after American astronomer and engineer Lindley N. Johnson at NASA's Jet Propulsion Laboratory. A space enthusiast since the age of 12, Johnson has been instrumental for the Near-Earth Asteroid Tracking program, which became operational at GEODSS on Hawaii (Haleakala-NEAT; 566) in December 1995. The approved naming citation was published by the Minor Planet Center on 3 May 1996.

Notes

References

External links 
 (5905) Johnson at johnstonarchive.net, Robert Johnston
 Asteroids with Satellites, Robert Johnston, johnstonsarchive.net
 Asteroid Lightcurve Database (LCDB), query form (info )
 Dictionary of Minor Planet Names, Google books
 Asteroids and comets rotation curves, CdR – Observatoire de Genève, Raoul Behrend
 Discovery Circumstances: Numbered Minor Planets (5001)-(10000) – Minor Planet Center
 
 

005905
Discoveries by Eleanor F. Helin
Named minor planets
005905
19890211